Gondalpara is a locality in Chandernagore Municipal Corporation of Hooghly district in the Indian state of West Bengal. It is a part of the area covered by Kolkata Metropolitan Development Authority (KMDA).

History
The town was a Danish possession, also known as Danmarksnagore in 1698–1714 as part of Danish India, governed from Tranquebar.

Geography
Gondalpara is located at 

It a small place located in South-East Chandannagar. It consists of about 15 sub-localities. Some of them are Monsatala, Kachhari Ghat, Satghata, Charmondirtala, Natun Tilighat, Kolo Pukur Dhar, Kadamtala, Moran Road, and Binodtala. It is bounded by Besohata and Tematha to the west, Hooghly River to the east and north and Telinipara in the south. It is a half-moon shaped area bounded by water on two sides.

References

Cities and towns in Hooghly district
Neighbourhoods in Kolkata
Kolkata Metropolitan Area
1698 establishments in Danish India
1710s disestablishments in the Danish colonial empire